Kim Sa-rang (Hangul: 김사랑; ; born 22 August 1989) is a South Korean badminton player. He competed at the Rio 2016 Summer Olympics.

Career 
Kim Sa-rang started playing badminton when he was in elementary school, and his international debut on the Osaka International tournament. He joined the Korea national badminton team in 2008. At that year, he won the Australia International Challenge tournament in the men's doubles event partnered with Choi Sang-won. In 2011, he won the Turkey International tournament in the men's doubles event with Kim Gi-jung.

In 2012, he and Kim Gi-jung won their first Superseries title at the Japan Open tournament. In the final round they beat the Malaysian pair Koo Kien Keat and Tan Boon Heong. At the 2012 Badminton Asia Championships in Qingdao, China, they won a gold medal after defeat Hiroyuki Endo and Kenichi Hayakawa of Japan in the final round. In September 2012, they also won the men's doubles title at the Indonesian Masters tournament.

In 2013, he became the champion at the Chinese Taipei and South Korea Grand Prix Gold tournament. At the Chinese Taipei, he and Kim Gi-jung beat the host partner Lee Sheng-mu and Tsai Chia-hsin in the straight set. At the Korea, they won the title after beat their compatriots Ko Sung-hyun and Shin Baek-cheol with the score 2–1. He also won a silver medal at the 2013 Badminton Asia Championships in Taipei. At the 2013 BWF World Championships in Guangzhou, he and his partner were seeded fifth in that tournament. They beat the second seeded of Malaysia in the quarterfinal round, and in the semifinal round they were defeated by Boe and Mogensen in three sets, and settle for the bronze medal. At the end of the 2013 BWF Season, he qualified to compete at the Super Series Masters Finals in Kuala Lumpur, Malaysia. Finally, he became the runner-up in the men's doubles event after defeated by Mohammad Ahsan and Hendra Setiawan of Indonesia. In 2014, he won a bronze medal at the Asian Games in the men's doubles event.

In 2015, he and Kim Gi-jung won the Korea Masters Grand Prix Gold tournament in the men's doubles event. In the final round they beat Ko Sung-hyun and Shin Baek-cheol with the score 16–21, 21–18, 21–19. They also won the China Open Super Series Premier tournament, after beat Chai Biao and Hong Wei in the straight games. In 2016, they also won the Superseries Premier tournament in Malaysia. He and his partner beat the third seeded from China in the quarterfinal round, and the world No.1 pair, Lee Yong-dae and Yoo Yeon-seong in the semifinal. In the final round they beat Chai Biao and Hong Wei with the score 21–19, 21–15. He and Kim Sa-rang also competed at the Summer Olympics in the men's doubles event. They lost in the quarterfinal round, defeated by Fu Haifeng and Zhang Nan of China with the score 21–11, 18-21 and 22–24. After the Rio Olympics, he decided to retire from the national team, and on 31 October 2016, BWF sites officially announced  his retirement. However, in 2018 he has since played as an independent player separate from the BKA with the Malaysian former world number one, Tan Boon Heong, in the Macau Open and Korea Masters.

Achievements

BWF World Championships 
Men's doubles

Asian Games 
Men's doubles

Asian Championships 
Men's doubles

Mixed doubles

Summer Universiade 
Men's doubles

Mixed doubles

BWF World Tour (2 titles)
The BWF World Tour, which was announced on 19 March 2017 and implemented in 2018, is a series of elite badminton tournaments sanctioned by the Badminton World Federation (BWF). The BWF World Tour is divided into levels of World Tour Finals, Super 1000, Super 750, Super 500, Super 300, and the BWF Tour Super 100.

Men's doubles

Mixed doubles

BWF Superseries (3 titles, 3 runners-up) 
The BWF Superseries, which was launched on 14 December 2006 and implemented in 2007, was a series of elite badminton tournaments, sanctioned by the Badminton World Federation (BWF). BWF Superseries levels were Superseries and Superseries Premier. A season of Superseries consisted of twelve tournaments around the world that had been introduced since 2011. Successful players were invited to the Superseries Finals, which were held at the end of each year.

Men's doubles

  BWF Superseries Finals tournament
  BWF Superseries Premier tournament
  BWF Superseries tournament

BWF Grand Prix (4 titles, 4 runners-up) 
The BWF Grand Prix had two levels, the Grand Prix and Grand Prix Gold. It was a series of badminton tournaments sanctioned by the Badminton World Federation (BWF) and played between 2007 and 2017.

Men's doubles

  BWF Grand Prix Gold tournament
  BWF Grand Prix tournament

BWF International Challenge/Series (6 titles, 4 runners-up) 
Men's doubles

Mixed doubles

  BWF International Challenge tournament
  BWF International Series tournament

References

External links 

 

1989 births
Living people
Sportspeople from Incheon
South Korean male badminton players
Badminton players at the 2016 Summer Olympics
Olympic badminton players of South Korea
Badminton players at the 2014 Asian Games
Asian Games gold medalists for South Korea
Asian Games bronze medalists for South Korea
Asian Games medalists in badminton
Medalists at the 2014 Asian Games
Universiade gold medalists for South Korea
Universiade bronze medalists for South Korea
Universiade medalists in badminton
Medalists at the 2015 Summer Universiade